Nataf (lit. Stacte) is a community settlement in central Israel.

Etymology
Its biblical name is adopted from the Hebrew word for stacte, one of the spices used in the Temple.

History
According to Walid Khalidi, Nataf was founded in 1982 on land belonging to the depopulated Palestinian village of Bayt Thul, less than 1 km south of the village site of Nitaf. The village website states that Nataf was built on land bought from Arabs. According to Davar 40 Israeli families bought the land from Abu Ghosh Arabs.

Religious outlook
Only 20% of the residents are Modern Orthodox; 80% of the residents are secular. The village has a unique unaffiliated synagogue with three sections for prayer: a men's section, a women's section and a mixed section.

Geography
Nataf is situated on a ridge bounded by Kefira Valley to the north and Hamisha Valley to the south; the elevation is around 500m above MSL. It lies at the end of a 3-mile road that passes through Abu Ghosh.

Nataf overlooks Nataf Valley, a popular hiking destination. Nataf spring is watered all year round and has a number of small freshwater pools.

Notable residents
Avram Burg (b. 1955), politician, author and businessman
Bradley Burston, retired journalist
Ehud Shapiro (b. 1955), multi-disciplinary scientist, artist and entrepreneur

References

Community settlements
Populated places established in 1982
Populated places in Jerusalem District
1982 establishments in Israel